Suckers was an American, Brooklyn-based, indie rock band.

Band members

Current
 Quinn Walker - Vocals, Guitar, Sampler, Percussion
 Austin Fisher - Guitar, Keyboard, Sampler, Vocals
 Pan - Bass Guitar, Trumpet, Drum Pad, Percussion, Vocals

Former
 Brian Aiken - Drums, Keyboard, Vocals

Discography

Albums
 Suckers EP  (2009)
 Wild Smile  (2010)
 Candy Salad  (2012)

External links

Indie rock musical groups from New York (state)
Indie pop groups from New York (state)
American art rock groups
Musical groups from Brooklyn
Frenchkiss Records artists
Iamsound Records artists